The Smart Upper Stage for Innovative Exploration (SUSIE) is a proposal for a reusable spacecraft capable of being either an "automated freighter" or to carry up to 5 astronauts to low Earth orbit, designed by ArianeGroup to be launched on the Ariane 64 for European Space Agency (ESA) missions.

The proposal was announced at the 2022 International Astronautical Congress in Paris and was created with research-funding from ESA's "New European Space Transportation Solutions" (NESTS) initiative – in response to the strategic priority to ensure it has "autonomous logistics capabilities". Intended to replace the payload fairing the total mass would be 25 tons, "...corresponding to Ariane 64’s low Earth orbit (LEO) performance." and capable of carrying 5 astronauts or, in automated cargo configuration, up to 7 tons of payload. It would propulsively land (rather than under parachutes), meaning the mission abort safety system would remain effective at all stages of a crewed mission, not just at launch. SUSIE could later be used in conjunction with a proposed ArianeGroup reusable heavy-lift launcher. 

Especially due to the “bellyflop maneuver” on atmospheric re-entry, comparisons are made with SpaceX Starship, whereas it is more directly comparable to SpaceX Dragon and Boeing Starliner, Commentator Scott Manley compared the proposal to the previously canceled Hermes spaceplane, "...but larger and ditching the wings for propulsive landing. It also resembles a large version of the uncrewed Space Rider which is potentially launching on Vega-C next year."

References

External links 

 Announcement at press.ariane.group

Arianespace
Proposed crewed spacecraft